Robert Whitaker is an American journalist and author, writing primarily about medicine, science, and history. He is the author of five books, three of which cover the history or practice of modern psychiatry. He has won numerous awards for science writing, and in 1998 he was part of a team writing for the Boston Globe that was shortlisted for the 1999 Pulitzer Prize for Public Service for a series of articles questioning the ethics of psychiatric research in which unsuspecting patients were given drugs expected to heighten their psychosis. He is the founder and publisher of Mad in America, a webzine critical of the modern psychiatric establishment.

Career 
Whitaker was a medical writer at the Albany Times Union newspaper in Albany, New York from 1989 to 1994. In 1992, he was a Knight Science Journalism fellow at MIT. Following that, he became director of publications at Harvard Medical School. In 1994, he co-founded a publishing company, CenterWatch, that covered the pharmaceutical clinical trials industry. CenterWatch was acquired by Medical Economics, a division of The Thomson Corporation, in 1998.

In 2002, USA Today published Whitaker's article "Mind drugs may hinder recovery" in its editorial/opinion section.
In 2004, Whitaker published a paper in the non-peer-reviewed journal Medical Hypotheses, titled 
"The case against antipsychotic drugs: a 50-year record of doing more harm than good". In 2005, he published his paper Anatomy of an Epidemic: Psychiatric Drugs and the Astonishing Rise of Mental Illness in America in the peer-reviewed journal Ethical Human Psychology and Psychiatry. In his book Anatomy of an Epidemic, published in 2010, Whitaker continued his work.

Mad in America 

He has written on and off for the Boston Globe and in 2001, he wrote his first book Mad in America about psychiatric research and medications, the domains of some of his earlier journalism.
He appeared in the film Take These Broken Wings: Recovery from Schizophrenia Without Medication released in 2008, a film detailing the pitfalls of administering medication for the illness.

Anatomy of an Epidemic 

An IRE 2010 book award winner for best investigative journalism, this book investigates why the number of mentally ill patients in America receiving SSI or SSDI disability checks keeps rising, despite the so-called "psychopharmacological revolution." Whitaker's main thesis is that psychopharmacological drugs work well to curb acute symptoms. However, patients receiving prolonged treatment courses often end up more disabled than they started. Despite these results from several landmark studies in the 1970s, in the 1980s pharmaceutical companies such as Eli Lily together with the American Psychiatric Association began more aggressively pushing second generation anti-depressants and anti-psychotics on psychiatric patients. Many prominent academic psychiatrists worked as key opinion leaders for the pharmaceutical companies, and were compensated millions of dollars.

Awards and honors 
Articles that Whitaker co-wrote won the 1998 George Polk Award for Medical Writing and the 1998 National Association of Science Writers’ Science in Society Journalism Award for best magazine article.

A 1998 Boston Globe article series he co-wrote on psychiatric research was a finalist for the 1999 Pulitzer Prize for Public Service.

In April 2011, IRE announced that Anatomy of an Epidemic had won its award as the best investigative journalism book of 2010 stating, "this book provides an in-depth exploration of medical studies and science and 
intersperses compelling anecdotal examples. In the end, Whitaker punches holes in the 
conventional wisdom of treatment of mental illness with drugs."

Books 
Mad In America: Bad Science, Bad Medicine, and The Enduring Mistreatment of the Mentally Ill, Perseus Publishing, December 24, 2001, 
The Mapmaker's Wife:  A True Tale of Love, Murder, and Survival in the Amazon, Basic Books, April 13, 2004, 
On the Laps of Gods: The Red Summer of 1919 and the Struggle for Justice That Remade a Nation, Crown, June 10, 2008, 
Anatomy of an Epidemic: Magic Bullets, Psychiatric Drugs, and the Astonishing Rise of Mental Illness in America, Crown, April 13, 2010, 
 Psychiatry Under The Influence: Institutional Corruption, Social Injury, and Prescriptions for Reform, with Lisa Cosgrove, Palgrave Macmillan, April 23, 2015,

References

Further reading
 Whitaker, Robert (2021). Do antipsychotics reduce the risk of relapse? In: Peter Lehmann & Craig Newnes (Eds.), Withdrawal from Prescribed Psychotropic Drugs. Berlin/Lancaster: Peter Lehmann Publishing.
{{citation |date=June 19, 2002 |author=Daniel J. Luchins |title=Mental Illness |series=Review of Mad in America: Bad Science, Bad Medicine, and the Enduring Mistreatment of the Mentally Ill |journal=Journal of the American Medical Association |volume=287 |issue=23 |pages=3149–3150 |doi=10.1001/jama.287.23.3149}}
""Anatomy of an Epidemic": The hidden damage of psychiatric drugs", Salon, Jed Lipinski, April 27, 2010
 "Are Prozac and Other Psychiatric Drugs Causing the Astonishing Rise of Mental Illness in America?", AlterNet, Bruce E. Levine, April 28, 2010
 Whitaker, Robert (2007). Preface to: Peter Stastny & Peter Lehmann (Eds.), Alternatives Beyond Psychiatry (pp. 9–10). Berlin/Eugene/Shrewsbury: Peter Lehmann Publishing.  (UK),  (USA). E-Book in 2018.
 Whitaker, Robert (2007). Vorwort zu: Peter Lehmann & Peter Stastny (Hg.), Statt Psychiatrie 2 (S. 9-10). Berlin/Eugene/Shrewsbury: Antipsychiatrieverlag. . E-Book in 2018.
 Whitaker, Robert (2012). Πρόλογος, στο: Πέτερ Λέμαν, Πέτερ Στάστνι & Άννα Εμμανουηλίδου (επιμ.),  Αντί της ψυχιατρικής. Η φροντίδα του ψυχικού πόνου έξω από την ψυχιατρική'' (σ. 9–11). Θεσσαλονίκη: εκδ. Νησίδες 2012. .

External links
 C-SPAN video, Whitaker talks for 1.5 hours about subjects in his book Anatomy of an Epidemic like how antidepressants work, the chemical imbalance myth, and the importance of best-use policies with drugs
 Mad in America Robert Whitaker's blog for the magazine Popular Psychology.
 
 
 Take These Broken Wings Daniel Mackler - Full movie.

American male journalists
American science writers
Harvard Medical School people
Year of birth missing (living people)
Living people
George Polk Award recipients
Anti-psychiatry